Kaspi is a Jewish surname.

People with the surname include:
 Haya Kaspi (born 1948), Israeli operations researcher, statistician, and probability theorist
 Matti Kaspi (born 1949), Israeli composer, and musician
 Omri Kaspi (born 1988), Israeli basketball player
 Victoria Kaspi (born 1967), American-Canadian astrophysicist
 Werner Kaspi (born 1917), Israeli footballer

See also 
 Caspi (disambiguation)

Jewish surnames